Eleocharis philippinensis is a sedge of the family Cyperaceae that is native to Southeast Asia, Melanesia (up to New Caledonia), and parts of northern Australia and southern China.

It commonly grows in flooded fields.

References

Plants described in 1929
Flora of Western Australia
philippinensis
Flora of tropical Asia
Flora of Guangdong
Flora of Hainan
Flora of Melanesia